Steven Bach (April 29, 1938 – March 25, 2009) was an American writer and lecturer on film and a former senior vice-president and head of worldwide productions for United Artists studios.

Career
Starting out at Pantheon Films he worked on The Parallax View and the original The Taking of Pelham One Two Three, going on to produce Mr. Billion and Butch and Sundance: The Early Days. Moving on to United Artists he was responsible for highly successful films like Raging Bull, The French Lieutenant’s Woman, Stardust Memories, Manhattan, Annie Hall, Eye of the Needle and Cutter and Bone.

However, he was also closely involved in the troublesome production and release of Heaven's Gate (1980). He wrote a book about the ordeal, called Final Cut: Art, Money, and Ego in the Making of Heaven's Gate, the Film That Sank United Artists, where, according to the LA Times, he "was unsparing about his own failures, and those of Cimino, who, by the end of the first six days of shooting, was five days behind schedule and had spent almost a million dollars on 1 1/2 minutes of film." United Artists was sold to MGM while Heaven's Gate was being shown at the Cannes Film Festival.

Later years
His book was made into the 2004 documentary Final Cut: The Making and Unmaking of Heaven's Gate, featuring interviews with Bach and others involved in the production, as well as archival material. The book received positive reviews from the Los Angeles Times and the New York Times, with the latter calling it "a fascinating and detailed account of the imbroglio that attended the creation of a catastrophically bad movie." The book review site The Pequod rated the book a 9.5 (out of 10.0) and said, "By using a specific case study, Bach has produced one of the best insider accounts of what it is really like to make a movie — how the studio, director, producers, and actors all work together to steer a project from the time of screenwriting through its release."

In 1990, he was a member of the jury at the 40th Berlin International Film Festival.

Bach is the author of The Life and Legend of Marlene Dietrich and Dazzler: The Life and Times of Moss Hart. His biography of the Nazi-associated filmmaker Leni: The Life and Work of Leni Riefenstahl (2007) overturns many of the claims Riefenstahl put forward in her self-defence regarding her contact with Hitler's regime, and was named by The New York Times as one of the best books of 2007.

He taught film studies at Columbia University and Bennington College.

Bach died of cancer in March 2009. He is survived by his companion, Werner Röhr.

Bibliography
 Final Cut: Dreams and Disaster in the Making of Heaven's Gate, 1985, New York: William Morrow, 
 Marlene Dietrich: Life and Legend, 1992, New York: William Morrow, 
 Dazzler: The Life and Times of Moss Hart, 2001, New York: Alfred A. Knopf, 
 Leni: The Life and Work of Leni Riefenstahl, 2007, New York: Alfred A. Knopf).

References

External links
 
 
The documentary in its entirety on YouTube

American male biographers
American film historians
American film studio executives
People from Pocatello, Idaho
1938 births
2009 deaths
Historians from Idaho
20th-century American biographers
20th-century male writers
20th-century American male writers
American LGBT writers